"Angels" is a song by American hip hop recording artist Chance the Rapper. The song was released on October 27, 2015, as the lead single from his third solo mixtape, Coloring Book (2016). The track, produced by Lido and The Social Experiment, features vocal by fellow Chicago rapper Saba.

Music video
The song's accompanying music video premiered on April 7, 2016, on Chance the Rapper's YouTube account. It was directed by Austin Vesely and Chance the Rapper. The video was nominated for Best Hip-Hop Video at the 2016 MTV Video Music Awards.

Charts

Release history

References

External links

Lyrics of this song at Genius

2015 singles
2015 songs
Chance the Rapper songs
Songs written by Chance the Rapper